Chronicles may refer to:

 Books of Chronicles, in the Bible
 Chronicle, chronological histories
 The Chronicles of Narnia, a novel series by C. S. Lewis
 Holinshed's Chronicles, the collected works of Raphael Holinshed
 The Idhun Chronicles, a Netflix anime-style series based on the Idhún's Memories book trilogy by Laura Gallego
 Book of Chronicles, an alternate name for the Nuremberg Chronicle of 1493
 Chronicles: Volume One, Bob Dylan's autobiography
 Chronicles (magazine), a conservative magazine from the Rockford Institute
 Chronicles (Magic: The Gathering), an expansion set of the Magic: The Gathering trading card game
 Froissart's Chronicles, a prose history of the Hundred Years' War written in the 14th century by Jean Froissart
 Samurai Rabbit: The Usagi Chronicles, an upcoming Netflix CGI-animated series loosely based on the Usagi Yojimbo comics by Stan Sakai

Albums 
Chronicles (Audiomachine album), 2012
Chronicles (David Arkenstone album), 1993
Chronicles (Free album), 2006
Chronicles (Jon and Vangelis album), 1994
Chronicles (Rush album), 1990
 Chronicles (video), a compilation of music videos by Rush
Chronicles (Steve Winwood album), 1987
Chronicles (The Velvet Underground album), 1991
 The Chronicles (E.S.G. album), 2008

Films

 The English name of the 2004 Ecuadorian thriller film, Crónicas

See also
 Chronicle (disambiguation)